Maramao is a 1987 Italian film by Giovanni Veronesi at his directorial debut.

Cast
Vanessa Gravina as Patrizia
Maurizio Begotti as Sandro
Filippo Tempesti as Giannino
Alberto Frasca as Pippo
Cristina Sivieri as Chiara
Romney Williams as Paolo
Novello Novelli the Lone Sailor
Carlo Monni

References

External links

1987 films
Films directed by Giovanni Veronesi
Italian drama films
1980s Italian-language films
1980s Italian films